"Vacation" is a 1982 single released by the all-female rock band, the Go-Go's. The song was the first single from the album, Vacation.

The song became one of the Go-Go's highest charting singles, reaching No. 8 on the Billboard Hot 100 in August 1982, being the band's second and final US top-10 hit. The song was released on 7" vinyl format, with the surf rock song "Beatnik Beach" as the single's B-side. "Vacation" carries the distinction of being released as the first known cassette single or "cassingle" as trademarked by I.R.S. Records.

Billboard called it a "perfect summer record" saying it is "uptempo, optimistic and the aural companion for lazy days at the beach.  Cash Box called it "propulsive power pop." 

A previous version of "Vacation" written solely by Kathy Valentine was an EP and later 45 by the earlier band she was in, The Textones. Both the EP and 45 were on Chiswick Records in the United Kingdom.

The Textones version is the opening theme song of the Starz cable series Hightown.

Music video
The video, which was directed by Mick Haggery and C.D.Taylor, starts by showing the song's title on a photo in a travel brochure. It depicts the band first waiting on a pile of luggage at an airport after Belinda Carlisle arrives in a taxi. Gradually it changes to show them performing, then ends with a section in which they appear to be water-skiing in formation, as on the album cover. All the band members smile and mug for the camera in individual closeups. The photo then freezes and zooms out to be shown in another travel brochure on the floor, which an unseen janitor sweeps up, with other trash (most likely from the airport portion of the video).

It was shot in one very long day on a $50,000 budget, large for the time, and the band was coming off a debut album that had reached no. 1. "We still saw videos as an annoying waste of time," recalls Jane Wiedlin. "After seven or eight hours we sent out someone to sneak in booze." Kathy Valentine says they drank "lots of champagne. Lots." Wiedlin says the effects are evident during the closeups of the women at the end: "... if you look at our eyes, we're all so drunk. We didn't even try to make it look like we were really waterskiing."

Track listing
7-inch and cassette single
A. "Vacation" – 2:59 (2:55 on cassette)
B. "Beatnik Beach" – 2:52 (2:45 on cassette)

In popular culture

The Go-Go's performed "Vacation", "Our Lips Are Sealed", and "We Got the Beat" during the 2021 Rock and Roll Hall of Fame Induction Ceremony.

Charts

Weekly charts

Year-end charts

References

1982 singles
The Go-Go's songs
Songs written by Charlotte Caffey
Songs written by Jane Wiedlin
Songs written by Kathy Valentine
Song recordings produced by Richard Gottehrer
1982 songs
I.R.S. Records singles